Skillebekk is a neighbourhood of Oslo, Norway. It is located near Solli plass in the West End of Oslo, and is served by the station Skillebekk on the Skøyen Line. The name origins from Skillebekken, a brook between Bymarken and Frogner Hovedgård.

References

Neighbourhoods of Oslo